Rosemond is a surname. Notable people with the surname include:

Anna Rosemond (1886–1966), American actress
Clinton Rosemond (1882–1966), American actor
John Rosemond (born 1947), American psychologist and author
Ken Rosemond (1930–1993), American college basketball coach